Branislav Miličević (born 23 July 1983) is a Serbian football defender who is a free agent. His latest club was the Norwegian Start.

He came to Start in 2008, and has been a regular on the team in the 2008 season. Miličević has earlier played for the Serbian club FK Šumadija Jagnjilo, and the Icelandic club Keflavík.

Miličević' contract expired after the 2011 season, and he was not offered a new contract and left the club who was relegated from Tippeligaen.

Career statistics

References

External links
Club bio
Current season statistics from Verdens Gang

1983 births
Living people
Serbian footballers
IK Start players
Norwegian First Division players
Eliteserien players
Serbian expatriate footballers
Expatriate footballers in Iceland
Expatriate footballers in Norway
Serbian expatriate sportspeople in Iceland
Serbian expatriate sportspeople in Norway
Association football defenders
Knattspyrnudeild Keflavík players